Sosnówka  is a village in the administrative district of Gmina Nowa Słupia, within Kielce County, Świętokrzyskie Voivodeship, in south-central Poland.

In 2005 the village had a population of 660.

References

Villages in Kielce County